David M. Smick, Sr. is a global macroeconomic strategist, magazine publisher, best-selling author, and documentary filmmaker.  He is the chairman and CEO of Johnson Smick International, a global strategic advisory firm in Washington, D.C. where he is in partnership with former Federal Reserve Vice Chairman Manuel H. Johnson. The firm provides strategic advice to a group of leading global money managers. (The firm's first client was Soros Fund Management.) Smick is a registered independent.

Smick’s first book, The World Is Curved (2008) was described by David Brooks of the New York Times as "astonishingly prescient." The book discussed the financial perils of globalization, in response to The World Is Flat bestseller by Thomas Friedman, and questioned whether the Wall Street banks were in full understanding of the values of the assets on their balance sheets. The book arrived as the 2007–2008 financial crisis was hitting. President Bill Clinton called it "one of the three best books on the financial crisis." Smick's second bestseller, The Great Equalizer: How Main Street Capitalism Can Create an Economy for Everyone, argues that a ruthless corporate elite with deep political connections is making American capitalism less efficient, producing a dangerous decline in social mobility. 

Beginning in 1985, Smick co-organized a series of distinguished global monetary conferences, sponsored by the U.S. congressional leadership, involving many of the industrialized world’s finance  ministers, central bankers, and leading foreign exchange experts. The conferences took place over the course of a decade in Tokyo, New York, Washington, Frankfurt, Vienna and Zurich. The first conference set the stage for the official 1985 Plaza Accord, the G5 agreement to bring down the value of the dollar during heightened trade tensions. Washington Post correspondent Hobart Rowen wrote that the conference was an important “final nail in the coffin of the pure floating exchange rate system.” 

Senator Bill Bradley (D-NJ), a conference co-sponsor, at a later event in Zurich, floated the idea of developing-world debt restructuring which, within several years, led to the issuance of the popular Brady Bonds. Those bonds helped lead to a developing world economic rebound.

David Smick is the founder (1987), publisher, and editor of the distinguished quarterly magazine The International Economy.

In 2020 (with help from Academy Award-winning director Barry Levinson who served as executive producer), Smick wrote and directed Stars and Strife, a full-length documentary that predicted a coming tidal wave of political, social, and economic division in America. David Ignatius of the Washington Post called the film "superb." Smick's 2023 documentary America's Burning, soon to be released, features a cast that includes James Carville, Leon Panetta, James Baker, Katherine Gehl, Larry Summers, Stan Druckenmiller, Arthur Brooks, Rahm Emanuel, Ian Bremmer, Hawk Newsome, and many others.

Books
 The Great Equalizer: How Main Street Capitalism Can Create an Economy for Everyone (PublicAffairs, 2017).
 The World Is Curved: Hidden Dangers to the Global Economy (Penguin Portfolio, 2008).

References

External links

Year of birth missing (living people)
Living people
American economics writers
American male non-fiction writers